The Turkish State Railways (TCDD) 57001 Class is a class of 2-10-2 steam locomotives.  They were built by Henschel, Berliner Maschinenbau and  Krupp for TCDD.  The 27 locomotives in this class were numbered 57001 to 57027.  The first arrived in 1933, the last in 1937.

Preserved
Around 14 locomotives of this series has been preserved. 
 57001: Çamlık Museum
 57007: Ankara Museum
 57011: Isparta
 57018: Çamlık Museum
 57023: Çamlık Museum
 57026: Çamlık Museum

External links 
 57001 to 57027 Trains of Turkey

2-10-2 locomotives
57001
Steam locomotives of Turkey
Standard gauge locomotives of Turkey
Railway locomotives introduced in 1933
Henschel locomotives
Krupp locomotives
Berliner locomotives